Kunvarjibhai Mohanbhai Bavaliya is the Minister Of Water Supply, Water Resource, Food Civil Supply,  Animal Husbandry, Rural Housing in the Government Of Gujarat. All India Coli Samaj, New Delhi, President Bavaliya belong to the Koli caste of Gujarat.

When Bavaliya was excluded from cabinet ministry in the Gujarat government, there was a protest by people in Rajkot district to make him a minister.

Education and background
Bavaliya holds BSc and BEd degrees from Saurashtra University and Gujarat University. He was a farmer by profession before joining politics.

Posts held

08 || 2022  || Onward || MLA, (Gujarat Legislative Assembly
|}

See also
 List of Koli people
 List of Koli states and clans

List of members of the 15th Lok Sabha of India
Politics of India
Parliament of India
Government of India
Gujarat Legislative Assembly

References 

India MPs 2009–2014
Living people
1955 births
Lok Sabha members from Gujarat
Gujarat MLAs 1998–2002
Gujarat MLAs 1995–1998
Gujarat MLAs 2002–2007
Gujarat MLAs 2007–2012
Bharatiya Janata Party politicians from Gujarat